Maxim De Cuyper (born 22 December 2000) is a Belgian professional footballer who plays as a left-back for Belgian First Division A club Westerlo, on loan from Club Brugge.

Club career
De Cuyper began his career at the youth academy of Club Brugge. On 20 February 2020, De Cuyper made his professional debut for Brugge against Manchester United in the first-leg of the UEFA Europa League Round of 32. He started and played 73 minutes as Club Brugge drew 1–1. De Cuyper was then a starter again for Brugge in the second leg of the tie and played the whole match as Brugge fell 0–5. On 30 August 2020, De Cuyper made his debut for Club NXT, Brugge's reserve team, in Belgian First Division B. He came on as a 64th minute substitute as Brugge were defeated 2–2. On 4 February 2022, Club Brugge announced that they had extended de Cuyper's contract through 2025.

On 2 August 2021, he joined Westerlo on loan for the 2021–22 season. The loan was extended for the 2022–23 season.

Career statistics

Club

Honours
Club Brugge
 Belgian Super Cup: 2021
Westerlo

 Belgian First Division B: 2021–22

References

External links
Profile at the Club Brugge website

2000 births
People from Knokke-Heist
Living people
Belgian footballers
Belgium youth international footballers
Association football midfielders
Club Brugge KV players
Club NXT players
K.V.C. Westerlo players
Challenger Pro League players
Footballers from West Flanders